Hilmer Löfberg (22 July 1887 – 23 July 1940) was a Swedish diver who competed in the 1908 Summer Olympics. In 1908 he was eliminated in the semi-finals of the 10 metre platform event.

References

External links

1887 births
1940 deaths
Swedish male divers
Olympic divers of Sweden
Divers at the 1908 Summer Olympics